Gobindram Darbar Sindhi (گوبند رام دربار) is situated at a distance of some kilometers from Manjhand town, Jamshoro District, Sindh, Pakistan, towards north-east. Locally it is also called Shiva Temple. It was built by Gobindram

References

External link

Jamshoro District
Shiva temples